Gurinderbir Singh Gill known professionally as Gurinder Gill is an Indo-Canadian singer and rapper associated with Punjabi music. His numerous tracks charted on UK Asian and Punjabi music charts by Official Charts Company; "Majhail" and "Brown Munde" have topped the charts. Gill released his debut EP Not By Chance in December 2020. Gurinder, alongside his label-mates AP Dhillon, Shinda Kahlon and Gminxr works as trio under their label ‘Run-Up Records’.

Career 

Gill started his career in 2019 with singles "Faraar" and "Feels". His single "Droptop", with AP Dhillon entered UK Asian chart by Official Charts Company, and peaked at number 28. Also, the song entered top 10 on UK Punjabi chart. In June 2020, he collaborated with AP Dhillon and Manni Sandhu for single "Majhail", which topped both the UK Asian and Punjabi charts, and became their best performance till date. In July 2020, he appeared in "Excuses" by Intense, which peaked at number 3 on UK Asian and topped the UK Punjabi chart. In September 2020, he released "Brown Munde" with Dhillon, Gminxr, and Shinda Kahlon. Nav, Sidhu Moose Wala, Money Musik, and Steel Banglez appeared in its music video. The song entered Apple Music chart in Canada. The song debuted at number one on UK Asian chart, became his second number one on the chart.

Discography

Extended plays

Singles discography

References 

1995 births
Living people
Punjabi-language singers
Indian singer-songwriters
Indian hip hop singers
Canadian singer-songwriters
Canadian hip hop singers
Desi musicians